Airport 5 was an American musical collaboration project between indie rock musicians Robert Pollard and Tobin Sprout, both members of the band Guided by Voices. Collaborating chiefly by mail, Sprout provided completed backing tracks which he composed, and Pollard added his own lyrics and vocals.  Two 7-inch singles and two full-length albums were released between 2001 and 2002: Tower in the Fountain of Sparks and Life Starts Here.

Discography

Studio albums
Tower in the Fountain of Sparks – (2001)
Life Starts Here – (2002)

Singles 
Stifled Man Casino (7" - Fading Captain Series ) – (2001)
Total Exposure (7" - Fading Captain Series ) – (2001)

Compilations 
 Selective Service (Fading Captain Series - with Guided By Voices) – (2001)

References

External links

Musical groups from Dayton, Ohio